The 1974 UTEP Miners football team was an American football team that represented the University of Texas at El Paso in the Western Athletic Conference during the 1974 NCAA Division I football season. In their first year under head coach Gil Bartosh, the team compiled a 4–7 record.

Schedule

References

UTEP
UTEP Miners football seasons
UTEP Miners football